The 1964–65 season was Kilmarnock’s 63rd in Scottish league competitions, during which they became league champions for the first time in the club’s history. The title was won on the final day of the season with a 2–0 win at Hearts. Kilmarnock won the championship on goal average, a tie-breaker that was replaced by goal difference in 1971–72. Had goal difference been adopted by 1964–65, Hearts would have won the championship.

Scottish Division One

Scottish League Cup

Group stage

Group 3 final table

Scottish Cup

Inter-Cities Fairs Cup

Killie pulled off a remarkable comeback in their first round Fairs Cup tie against German side Eintracht Frankfurt. They lost 3–0 in the first away leg and conceded again in the second minute of the return game at Rugby Park to fall four goals behind, but then scored five goals without reply to win the tie 5–4 on aggregate.

1965 Summer Cup

Section 3 Final Table

See also
Kilmarnock F.C. in European football
List of Kilmarnock F.C. seasons

References

External links
https://www.fitbastats.com/kilmarnock/team_results_season.php

Kilmarnock F.C. seasons
Kilmarnock
Scottish football championship-winning seasons